Durutli is a village in the southeastern part of North Macedonia. It is located in the municipality of Dojran.

Demographics
As of the 2021 census, Durutli had 4 residents with the following ethnic composition:
Persons for whom data are taken from administrative sources 3
Turks 1

According to the 2002 census, the settlement had a total of 16 inhabitants. Ethnic groups in the village include:
Turks 16

References

Villages in Dojran Municipality
Turkish communities in North Macedonia